Andrew Ryan may refer to:

Andrew Ryan (BioShock), a character in the 2007 video game BioShock
Andrew Ryan (rugby league) (born 1978), Australian rugby league player
Andrew Ryan (diplomat) (1876–1949), British diplomat
Andrew Ryan (actor), Australian actor
Andy Ryan (born 1994), Scottish professional footballer

See also
Andrew Ryan McGill (1840–1905), American politician